Direct Behavior Rating (DBR) is a behavior assessment method that educational professionals, such as school psychologists and teachers, use to monitor student behavior. It is characterized by:
 Recording a rating immediately after a specified observation period
 Using a rater with firsthand experience with the rated individual for the duration of the observation period (e.g., a teacher in a classroom where one student is the target)
 Requiring "minimal inference" from the rater to discern relevant behaviors For instance, if a teacher was concerned about a student's disruptive behavior during math class and wanted to collect data on their behavior, they could explicitly define "disruptive behavior", observe the student's behavior during typical math instruction, and at the end of class, record for what percentage of time the student displayed disruptive behavior. This is an example of DBR using a Single Item Scale, or DBR-SIS.

Direct Behavior Rating typically involves four steps:
 Specify a target behavior to monitor
 Rate that behavior after a specific observation period
 Share the information with concerned individuals (e.g., parents, teachers, students)
 Use outcome data to monitor the target behavior over time 

Direct Behavior Rating represents an amalgamation of characteristics from two major types of behavior collection systems: systematic direct observation and behavior rating scales. According to a survey performed in 2006, over 60% of classroom teachers report that they employ DBR or DBR-like tools within their classrooms and view it as a highly acceptable intervention tool. Recent research further indicates the acceptability of the measure to school psychologists who are frequently responsible for monitoring the effectiveness of research-based classroom interventions.

DBR is not restricted to a single form of assessment. Rather, it is a methodology that can be used with a wide range of behaviors, contexts, and applications. One common distinction is made between DBR scales that consist of solely one item representing a behavioral construct (i.e., disruptive behavior) (Single Item Scales, or DBR-SIS) and those that consist of multiple items that are individually scored and then aggregated to depict a single construct (i.e., "Inappropriately calls out during instruction," "Pokes other students during instruction") (Multiple Item Scales, or DBR-MIS). The majority of DBR research has focused on the Single Item Scale format, the content of which is intended to be flexibly determined based on the rating's context and then graphed and summarized independently of other Single Item Scales. While each DBR-SIS individually measures a single behavioral construct, the utility of using multiple Single Item Scales as general outcome measures for school-based social behavior has also been examined.

Research has also investigated the feasibility of incorporating DBR into intervention packages. One study used DBR as a combined intervention and assessment tool through its use as a self-monitoring intervention. Literature examining the use of daily behavior report cards or daily progress reports often use DBR methodology as an integral part of their intervention and assessment construction.

Given its promising psychometric properties, contextual relevance, and usability by practitioners with restricted resources (e.g., teachers), DBR has also been suggested as a possible assessment tool within multi-tiered intervention frameworks such as Response to Intervention.

References

External links
 Direct Behavior Ratings
 Intervention Central
 Center for Children and Families at the University at Buffalo

Behavioural sciences